The Ministry of Women, formerly the National Secretariat of Politics for Women, was created as a secretariat with cabinet-level during the first Lula da Silva administration, as a way to ensure that politics for women could have more attention. In 2019, it was fused with the Ministry of Human Rights and became the Ministry of Woman, Family and Human Rights (MMFDH), with an attribution to establish public politics for the enhancement of life of all women, LGBT people, indigenous people, black people of Brazil. The main goal of the Ministry is "[to] promote the equality between men and women and fight against any kind of prejudice and discrimination inherited from a patriarchal and excluding society."

Founded in 2003 by president Luiz Inácio Lula da Silva, the Secretariat was a child agency to the Presidency of the Republic, with Nilcéa Freire as chief minister. In 2010, the department was promoted to a cabinet-level, acting in three fronts: Policies of Labour and Economic Authonomy of Women, Fight against Violence against Women and programs and acts in the areas of health, education, culture, political participation, gender equality and diversity.

In its history, the Secretariat had invested, specially, in the fight against violence against women and teenagers. It had a fundamental role in the approval of Lei Maria da Penha in 2006 and develop actions such as the creation of the 180 hotline, the sign of the National for the Fight against Violence against Women with states and municipalities and the most recent program: Woman, Live without Violence.

Eleonora Menicucci was chief minister of the Secretariat until October 2015, when it was incorporated to the Ministry of Women, Racial Equality and Human Rights (MMIRDH), unifying the Secretariat of Politics to Promote Racial Equality, the Secretariat of Human Rights and the Secretariat of Politics for Women.

On 12 May 2016, acting president Michel Temer dissolved the ministry and attributed its functions to the Ministry of Justice, which became the Ministry of Justice and Citizenship.

From 2016 to 2017, the National Secretariat was headed by former congresswoman Fátima Pelaes, member of the women wing of the Brazilian Democratic Movement (MDB).

In 2018, Andreza Colatto, also member of the MDB women wing, was nominated as National Secretary of Politics for Women. Former congresswoman Eronildes Carvalho assumed office from 2019 to 2021.

Brazilian Woman's House Program
In 2015, the federal government and the secretariat coordinated the program Brazilian Woman's House, which is part of the program "Woman, Live without Violence", instituted by Federal Decree 8086/2013. The program aims to facilitate the access to public services that guarantee the fight against domestic violence and women's economical authonomy. It foresees the implantation of a national service network, beginning with units in 12 Brazilian capitals in 2015. The first unit, instituted by Ordinance 4/2015 of the Secretariat, was opened in February 2015 in Campo Grande, capital of Mato Grosso do Sul.

References

External links
 

Government ministries of Brazil